Talent Mandaza (born 11 December 1985) is a Zimbabwean association football player. She is a midfielder who plays for the Black Rhinos Queens. Mandaza is a member of the Zimbabwe women's national football team and represented the country in their Olympic debut at the 2016 Summer Olympics.

References

Zimbabwe women's international footballers
Footballers at the 2016 Summer Olympics
Olympic footballers of Zimbabwe
Living people
1985 births
Zimbabwean women's footballers
Women's association football midfielders